The Acts of Parliament (Commencement) Act (Ireland) 1795 or the Pre-Union Irish Statutes (Commencement) Act 1795 (35 Geo 3 c 12) (I) was an Act of the Parliament of Ireland.

This Act was repealed for Northern Ireland by section 1 of, and Part II of the Schedule to, the Statute Law Revision (Northern Ireland) Act 1973.

This Act was repealed for the Republic of Ireland by sections 2(1) and 3(1) of, and Part 1 of Schedule 2 to, the Statute Law Revision Act 2007.

See also
The Acts of Parliament (Commencement) Act 1793

References

External links
List of amendments and repeals in the Republic of Ireland from the Irish Statute Book.

Acts of the Parliament of Ireland (pre-1801)
1795 in law
1795 in Ireland